This is a list of French football transfers in the summer transfer window 2013 by club. Only transfers of Ligue 1 are included.

FC Girondins de Bordeaux

In:

Out:

HSC Montpellier

In:

Out:

FC Nantes

In:

Out:

Olympique Lyon

In:

Out

OSC Lille

In:

Out

AC Ajaccio

In:

Out

FC Lorient

In:

Out

Stade Reims

In:

Out

FC Valenciennes

In:

Out:

EA Guingamp

In:

Out

FC Sochaux-Montbéliard

In:

Out

AS Monaco

In:

Out

Olympique Marseille

In:

Out

Stade Rennais FC

In:

Out

FC Toulouse

In:

Out

OGC Nice

In:

Out

Paris Saint-Germain

In:

Out

SC Bastia

In:

Out

AS Saint-Étienne

In:

Out

FC Évian Thonon Gaillard

In:

Out

References

French
Transfers Summer 2013
2013